United Nations Security Council resolution 1028, adopted unanimously on 8 December 1995, after recalling previous resolutions on Rwanda, particularly Resolution 997 (1995), the Council considered a report by the Secretary-General and extended the mandate of the United Nations Assistance Mission for Rwanda (UNAMIR) for a period ending 12 December 1995. The extension was given so that the council had more time to consider the future of UNAMIR.

See also
 List of United Nations Security Council Resolutions 1001 to 1100 (1995–1997)
 Rwandan Civil War
 Rwandan genocide
 United Nations Observer Mission Uganda–Rwanda

References

External links
 
Text of the Resolution at undocs.org

 1028
1995 in Rwanda
Rwandan genocide
 1028
December 1995 events